Rensy Barradas (born 21 October 1990 in Willemstad) is an Aruban footballer who plays as a striker. He played at the 2014 FIFA World Cup qualifier.

International career

International goals
Scores and results list Aruba's goal tally first.

References 

1990 births
Living people
Association football forwards
Aruban footballers
Aruba international footballers